Dhabouli may refer to:

Dhabouli (Nepal), a village development committee in Dhanusa District, Janakpur Zone, Nepal
Dhabouli, India, a village located in Bihar State